Loudness Live 2002 is the seventh live album by the Japanese heavy metal band Loudness. It was recorded in 2002 and released in 2003 as a double multimedia CD.

Track listing
Disc one
"Biosphere" – 3:59
"Hellrider" – 5:33
"Loudness" – 5:50
"Sexy Woman" – 5:36
"Ares' Lament" – 6:04
"Wind from Tibet" – 5:09
"Slaughter House" – 3:50
"The End of Earth" – 4:59
"Stay Wild" – 6:22
"Crazy Night" – 8:31

Disc two
"Crazy Doctor" – 4:34
"In the Mirror" – 3:49
"S.D.I." – 5:50
"What's the Truth?" – 5:05
"The Pandemonium" – 4:47

Biosphere (live video at Shinjuku Loft, Tokyo, December 19, 2002)
Heavy Chains (live video at Club Citta Kawasaki, Tokyo, March 24, 2002)
Speed (live video at Club Citta Kawasaki, Tokyo, March 24, 2002)

Personnel
Loudness
Minoru Niihara - vocals
Akira Takasaki - guitars
Masayoshi Yamashita - bass 
Munetaka Higuchi - drums

Production
Masatoshi Sakimoto - engineer, mixing
Nobuko Shimura - assistant engineer
Yoichi Aikawa - mastering
Yukichi Kawaguchi, Nobuou Naka - supervisors
Junji Tada - executive producer

References

Loudness (band) live albums
2003 live albums
Japanese-language live albums